Hang Mei Tsuen is a village in the Ping Shan area of Yuen Long District, in Hong Kong. It is part of the Ping Shan Heritage Trail.

Administration
Hang Mei Tsuen is a recognized village under the New Territories Small House Policy.

History
Hang Tau Tsuen is one of the three wais (walled villages) and six tsuens (villages) established by the Tang Clan of Ping Shan, namely: Sheung Cheung Wai, Kiu Tau Wai, Fui Sha Wai, Hang Tau Tsuen, Hang Mei Tsuen, Tong Fong Tsuen, San Tsuen, Hung Uk Tsuen and San Hei Tsuen.

See also
 Walled villages of Hong Kong
 Hang Mei Tsuen stop

References

External links

 Delineation of area of existing village Hang Mei Tsuen (Ping Shan) for election of resident representative (2019 to 2022)
 Antiquities and Monuments Office. Hong Kong Traditional Chinese Architectural Information System. Hang Mei Tsuen 
 Antiquities and Monuments Office. Historic Building Appraisal. Ching Shu Hin, Nos. 104 & 109 Hang Mei Tsuen, Ping Shan Pictures
 Antiquities and Monuments Office. Historic Building Appraisal. Kun Ting Study Hall, Hang Mei Tsuen, Ping Shan Pictures
 Antiquities and Monuments Office. Historic Building Appraisal. Hung Shing Temple, Hang Mei Tsuen, Ping Shan Pictures
 Antiquities and Monuments Office. Historic Building Appraisal. Sing Hin Kung Study Hall, Hang Mei Tsuen, Ping Shan Pictures
 Antiquities and Monuments Office. Historic Building Appraisal. No. 64 Hang Mei Tsuen, Ping Shan Pictures
 Antiquities and Monuments Office. Historic Building Appraisal. No. 37 Hang Mei Tsuen, Ping Shan Pictures
 Antiquities and Monuments Office. Historic Building Appraisal. No. 148 Hang Mei Tsuen, Ping Shan Pictures
 Antiquities and Monuments Office. Historic Building Appraisal. Yeuk Hui Study Hall, No. 95 Hang Mei Tsuen, Ping Shan Pictures
 Antiquities and Monuments Office. Historic Building Appraisal. No. 66 Hang Mei Tsuen, Ping Shan Pictures

Villages in Yuen Long District, Hong Kong
Ping Shan